The Market Square (Finnish: Kauppatori, Swedish: Salutorget) is a central square in Helsinki, Finland. It is located in central Helsinki, at the eastern end of Esplanadi and bordering the Baltic Sea to the south and Katajanokka to the east. HSL maintains a year-round ferry link from Market Square to Suomenlinna, and in the summer there are also private companies providing ferry cruises, both to Suomenlinna and to other nearby islands. The Presidential Palace, Helsinki City Hall, Swedish Embassy and the Stora Enso Headquarters building (designed by Alvar Aalto) are all located adjacent to Market Square.

From spring to autumn, the Market Square is active with vendors selling fresh Finnish food and souvenirs. There are also many outdoor cafés at the square. Some cafés also provide meat pastries.

The height of the square's popularity is in early October, when the annual Helsinki herring market (silakkamarkkinat) begins.

A long tradition at the Market Square is a display of old American cars on the first Friday of every month. Any motorist with an interest in old American cars may participate in the display.

Seagulls have become an increasing menace in the Market Square, swooping down to snatch snacks and ice cream from the hands of unsuspecting tourists.

See also 
 Havis Amanda
 Keisarinnankivi
 Market Square, Kuopio

References

External links

Retail markets in Finland
Squares in Helsinki
Kaartinkaupunki